Christopher Reeves may refer to:

 Christopher Reginald Reeves (1936–2007), British banker
 Christopher B. Reeves (born 1958), television dialogue editor

See also
 Christopher Reeve (1952–2004), American actor, known for Superman films